The Cleveland Browns had spent three years with its operations suspended after Art Modell had relocated the Browns' organization and players to Baltimore, Maryland to form the Baltimore Ravens at the end of the 1995 NFL season. Upon returning to the league, in order to become competitive with existing teams, the Browns were awarded the first pick in the 1999 NFL Draft, and the league gave the Browns the opportunity to select current players from the other teams. That selection was provided by the 1999 National Football League expansion draft, held on February 9, 1999. 150 players were left unprotected by their teams for the Browns to draft.

Format
Each of the 30 existing teams were required to expose five players to the draft. Cleveland was allowed to select between 30 and 42 players. No more than two players could be drafted from a single team; after drafting one player from a team, that team had the option to remove up to two of the remaining four players from the draft pool.

Reception
Three years later The New York Times said that the Houston Texans would use the 1999 draft as an example of what not to do in the 2002 NFL expansion draft: "The Browns went for the usual mix of promising young players and veterans who were not over the hill. Apparently, Cleveland did not draft much of either. Only three of the 37 players the Browns took are still with the team and they all play on special teams." The team had the opportunity to draft quarterback Kurt Warner, that 1999 season's eventual NFL MVP, who at that point had not yet started a game and only had four completions in 11 passing attempts in the NFL, but declined to do so.

Player selections

References

Cleveland Browns lists
National Football League expansion draft
Expansion Draft, 1999
NFL Expansion Draft
NFL expansion draft
Events in Ohio
Sports in Canton, Ohio